Charlie Berens (born April 27, 1987) is an American journalist, comedian, and creator of "Manitowoc Minute". He has been featured on FOX, CBS, Funny or Die, TBS Digital, Variety, and MTV News. His observational humor often focuses on the Midwest.

Early life 
Berens grew up in the Wisconsin towns of Elm Grove and New Berlin, he graduated from Marquette University High School and studied broadcast journalism at the University of Wisconsin-Madison.

Career

Television journalism
Berens began his career working for the MTV News show Choose or Lose. He covered Wisconsin state politics and was arrested while covering protests at the 2008 Republican National Convention. In 2012, Tribune Media recruited Berens to host the comedic news show Nightcap. While a reporter for KDAF-TV, Berens won his first Regional Emmy.

In 2014, CBS Sports Network hired Berens to host the sports gameshow You're So Money and PMC made Berens the host of their comedy/entertainment news brand @Hollywood.

Berens has been featured on Funny or Die. His comedic mashups, including "If Jack Dawson was Really from Wisconsin," have garnered more than thirteen million views. He authored the book The Midwest Survival Guide: How We Talk, Love, Work, Drink, and Eat...Everything with Ranch (2021).

Manitowoc Minute
In 2017, Berens created Manitowoc Minute, a weekly comedic video series. The name refers to the Wisconsin city of Manitowoc. His "Oh My Gosh!" Tour, inspired by the series, sold out theaters across Wisconsin. Berens partnered with Madison brewery Ale Asylum to launch a beer inspired by Manitowoc Minute called Keep ‘Er Movin’. The Manitowoc Minute features segments that include the "Craiglist Kicker", "Craigslist Missed Connections", Kwik Trip and Fleet Farm jokes and fun catch phrases like "Keep'er Movin", "UFF DA", "Geez Louise", "Tell your folks I says hi", and "Watch out for deer". He has always ended the show with a salute to the WI troops, and most famously: "Go Packers and Fuck da Bears".

Other

Card Sale Game
On September 1, 2022, Berens and Dane Schaefer launched a Kickstarter crowdfunding campaign for their project Card Sale, a card-based party game with a Yard Sale theme. The campaign was fully funded in 48 hours, and ultimately raised three times their original funding goal of US$11,700. Card Sale officially launched in January 2023 and is available on the game's official web site.

UW-Madison Winter Commencement
On December 18, 2022, Berens gave the keynote speech for the UW-Madison Winter commencement at the Kohl Center. During the speech, Berens talked about his experiences struggling as a young journalist after graduation while working-in pieces of his Wisconsin comedy routine. Every graduating student received a free copy of his book and he held a signing event at the University Book Store on State Street.

Personal life
Berens was married to TV host, actress, and former Miss Wisconsin USA Alex Wehrley in 2015.  They divorced in late 2020. He resides in Milwaukee, Wisconsin and is Catholic.

References

External links 
 Official website
 Manitowoc Minute Website
 Card Sale Website

1987 births

Living people

American male journalists
American comedians
People from Wisconsin
Comedians from Wisconsin
Emmy Award winners